Harrington is a historic home located at Princess Anne, Somerset County, Maryland, United States. It is one of the very few existing two-story frame 18th century farm houses of the area. The land on which the house was built was patented to a Thomas Holbrook, relative of the builder, in 1682 and remained in the Holbrook family for over 120 years.

Harrington was listed on the National Register of Historic Places in 1975.

References

External links
, including photo from 1983, at Maryland Historical Trust

Houses in Somerset County, Maryland
Houses on the National Register of Historic Places in Maryland
Houses completed in 1682
National Register of Historic Places in Somerset County, Maryland
1682 establishments in Maryland